

266001–266100 

|-id=051
| 266051 Hannawieser ||  || Hanna Wieser (born 1957), a Swiss violinist || 
|-id=081
| 266081 Villyket ||  || Violet R. Ket (born 1985), a Bulgarian-American writer, director, and producer, and wife of the discoverer Joseph Masiero || 
|}

266101–266200 

|-bgcolor=#f2f2f2
| colspan=4 align=center | 
|}

266201–266300 

|-bgcolor=#f2f2f2
| colspan=4 align=center | 
|}

266301–266400 

|-bgcolor=#f2f2f2
| colspan=4 align=center | 
|}

266401–266500 

|-id=465
| 266465 Andalucia ||  || Andalucia (Andalusia) is an autonomous Spanish community with the largest number of inhabitants spread out over 80 000 km². The community is key to the history of southern Europe, and its ports were essential to the discovery and exploration of America. || 
|}

266501–266600 

|-bgcolor=#f2f2f2
| colspan=4 align=center | 
|}

266601–266700 

|-id=622
| 266622 Málna ||  || Szofia Málna Sárneczky (born 2010), the daughter of Hungarian discoverer Krisztián Sárneczky || 
|-id=646
| 266646 Zaphod ||  || Zaphod Beeblebrox, a fictional character in The Hitchhiker's Guide to the Galaxy by Douglas Adams || 
|}

266701–266800 

|-id=710
| 266710 Pedrettiadriana ||  || mother of astronomer Marco Micheli || 
|-id=711
| 266711 Tuttlingen ||  || Tuttlingen, a city in Baden-Württemberg, Germany || 
|-id=725
| 266725 Vonputtkamer ||  || Jesco von Puttkamer (1933–2012), a German-born aerospace engineer and senior NASA manager || 
|}

266801–266900 

|-id=854
| 266854 Sezenaksu ||  || Sezen Aksu (born 1954), a Turkish pop music singer, songwriter and producer || 
|-id=887
| 266887 Wolfgangries ||  || Wolfgang Ries (born 1968), an Austrian amateur astronomer and astrophotographer || 
|}

266901–267000 

|-id=921
| 266921 Culhane ||  || William Culhane (born 1930) is a retired mechanic and grandfather of one of the members of the discovering WISE-team. || 
|-id=983
| 266983 Josepbosch ||  || Josep Bosch (born 1983), son of Josep Maria Bosch, a principal observer and discoverer of minor planets at the Santa Maria de Montmagastrell Observatory  in Catalonia, Spain || 
|}

References 

266001-267000